The Honda Amaze (also known as Honda Brio Amaze for the first generation) is a 4-door A-segment sedan produced by Honda since 2013. It is mainly marketed in India, where sub-4-metre cars are given a lower excise duty compared to longer vehicles.

For the first generation, it was offered as the sedan counterpart to the Brio hatchback and shared most of its design and architecture with it, while the second-generation model is built on the separate platform from the Brio (derived from the sixth-generation City instead).



First generation (DF1/2; 2013)

Markets

India 

The first-generation Amaze debuted in India in April 2013 and developed at Honda R&D Asia Pacific Co., Ltd. in Bangkok, Thailand. Manufactured at Honda's facilities in Greater Noida and Rajasthan, it was claimed to have a localisation level of more than 90%. It was also the first Indian Honda model to offer a diesel engine option. Petrol models were also available.

The 1.5-litre N15A1 four-cylinder turbo-diesel engine was first made specifically for the Amaze, which was later used in the Mobilio and the BR-V. Receiving the "i-DTEC" moniker, it was derived from the 1.6-litre N16A1 unit used earlier in the European market Civic. This India-specific derivative was developed around excise/taxation rules which offer lower taxes for cars of sub-4-metre cars with engine displacement of less than 1.5-litre. The turbocharger used in the diesel engine was designed and built by Honeywell. The engine was claimed to be the lightest in its class.

The Indian market Amaze was initially offered in E, EX, S and VX grade levels. In January 2014, the SX grade was added and positioned between the S and VX grades. In conjunction of the first anniversary of the Amaze in India, the Anniversary Edition was launched in April 2014.

The facelift occurred in 2016, which consisted of updated grille, dashboard design, taillights, and the use of continuously variable transmission (CVT) for petrol model, replacing the 5-speed torque converter automatic unit. The engine choices remain unchanged.

The Privilege Edition was launched in July 2017, followed later by the Pride Edition in January 2018.

Thailand 
Sold as the Brio Amaze in Thailand, the grade levels offered were S and V. Both grades were powered by the 1.2-litre L12B3 i-VTEC four-cylinder petrol engine, which initially mated with either a 5-speed manual or a torque converter automatic transmission. The facelifted model was launched in May 2016, which dropped the manual transmission option and changed the torque converter automatic unit to a CVT.

Nepal 
The Nepalese market Amaze was launched in June 2013. Three grade levels were available: E, EX and S, all powered by the 1.2-litre L12B3 engine and initially only offered with a manual transmission option. The facelifted model was launched in June 2016 which added the CVT option.

Philippines 
Similar to Thailand, the car was sold as the Brio Amaze in the Philippines, which was launched at the Philippine International Motor Show in September 2014. CBU-imported from Thailand, the Philippine market Brio Amaze was powered by the 1.3-litre L13Z1 i-VTEC four-cylinder petrol engine mated with either a manual or a torque converter automatic transmission.

Second generation (DF5/6; 2018) 

The second-generation Amaze was unveiled at the February 2018 Auto Expo in India, which Honda claimed to be built on a standalone platform (derived from the sixth-generation City). The diesel engine option is available with a CVT as opposed to the previous torque converter automatic unit. Initial grade levels offered were E, S, V and VX.

The facelifted model was launched on 18 August 2021, which dropped the V grade.

Powertrain

Safety 
The Amaze is fitted with two airbags and anti-lock brakes. In Africa, a driver-side seatbelt reminder is standard equipment, while in India, there are seatbelt reminders for both front-seat occupants.

Global NCAP crash tested an African market Amaze unit in 2019. In the frontal offset crash test, protection of the head was rated good and airbag contact was stable. Dummy readings of chest compression showed limited risk of serious injury. The passenger compartment remained stable. There were dangerous structures behind the dashboard that could increase risk of knee injury to occupants of different sizes or seating positions, and Honda did not demonstrate otherwise. The footwell remained stable and the pedals released as intended. Although the Amaze's total score was enough for a five-star rating for adult protection, it was limited to four stars because the African market unit on test did not have a seatbelt reminder for the front passenger (Honda would also have had to pay for a side impact test).

Using the Maxi-Cosi child seats selected by Honda, the head of a three-year-old child dummy contacted the interior of the car during rebound, and the armrest deployed, ejecting the dummy.

Recall 
In July 2018, Honda Cars India recalled 7,290 units of the Amaze in regards to a potential issue with the electric power steering. Affected units were manufactured from 17 April to 24 May 2018.

Sales

References

External links 

  (India)

Amaze
Cars introduced in 2013
2020s cars
City cars
Sedans
Front-wheel-drive vehicles
Vehicles with CVT transmission
Cars of India